Hélène Marie Antigna (8 July 1837 – 10 March 1918) was a French painter.

Hélène-Marie Pettit was born at Melun), 8 July 1837.
She was a pupil of her husband, Jean Pierre Antigna, and of Eugène Delacroix. Her best works are small genre subjects. She exhibited every year after 1861; Chercheuse de bois mort (1861) and Retour du contrebandier (1868) are mentioned. In 1877, she exhibited at the Paris Salon, On n'entre pas! and the New Cider; in 1876, an Interior at Saint Brieuc and A Stable; in 1875, Tant va la cruche à l'eau.

References

External links 
 Marie Helene Antigna on Artnet

1837 births
1918 deaths
People from Melun
19th-century French painters
19th-century French women artists